Stanton's Mill is a historic grist mill complex located at Grantsville, Garrett County, Maryland, consisting of five interrelated buildings and structures. The Stanton's Mill building dates from about 1797. It is two stories and constructed of heavy timber frame with a gable roof; an addition was constructed in 1890. The complex includes a stone-faced, mid-19th-century timber crib dam and raceway, natural earthen tailrace, and a small, single-span stone arch bridge, dating to 1813, constructed as part of the National Road. Also on the property is a frame storage building, constructed about 1900.

It was listed on the National Register of Historic Places in 1983.

The mill is still operational and is located next to the Casselman River Bridge State Park.

References

External links
Stanton's Mill - official site
Article about the mill
, including photo from 1981, at Maryland Historical Trust
Stanton's Mill NRHP Nomination Form at Maryland State Archives (associated single-span bridge)

Industrial buildings completed in 1859
Buildings and structures in Garrett County, Maryland
Grinding mills in Maryland
Tourist attractions in Garrett County, Maryland
Historic districts on the National Register of Historic Places in Maryland
National Register of Historic Places in Garrett County, Maryland
Grinding mills on the National Register of Historic Places in Maryland